Magon was an unprotected cruiser of the  built for the French Navy in the 1870s. The ship was laid down in 1876 and was completed in 1882. In 1884, she was deployed to East Asia during the Sino-French War, along with several other vessels, but by the time she arrived, the war had ended. Magon was sent to the Pacific Ocean thereafter, eventually returning to France by 1890. She served in the North Atlantic Squadron in 1893 and 1894, before being struck from the naval register in 1895. She was sold for scrap the following year.

Design

The navy sought new unprotected cruisers that carried a heavier armament than earlier vessels, while maintaining a similar size to keep costs from increasing during a period of limited naval budgets. The design for the ships was drawn up by Victorin Sabattier. The vessels were intended to serve overseas in the French colonial empire.

She displaced  as designed. The ship had a ram bow and an overhanging stern. Her crew amounted to 269 officers and enlisted men. The ship's propulsion system consisted of a single compound steam engine driving a screw propeller. Steam was provided by six coal-burning fire-tube boilers that were ducted into a single funnel.

The ship was armed with a main battery of fifteen  M1870M 21.3-caliber guns. Two were placed in the forecastle, firing through embrasures as chase guns, one was atop the stern, and the remainder were placed in an amidships battery on the upper deck, six guns per broadside. Of the broadside guns, the forward three on each side were placed in sponsons, while the remaining three guns were in pivot mounts firing through embrasures. A pair of  Hotchkiss revolver cannon provided close-range defense against torpedo boats. She also carried a pair of  bronze mountain guns or a single  field gun that could be sent ashore with a landing party.

Service history
She was commissioned to begin sea trials on 1 July 1882, which included full-power tests on 31 August. Her trials were completed shortly thereafter, and she was placed in the 2nd category of reserve on 9 September. The ship was reactivated around December 1884 for a deployment to East Asia. She departed from Cherbourg on 31 December to begin her voyage overseas. The ships departed Brest on 21 February and stopped in Algiers, French Algeria, on 3 March while en route. By 25 April, they had arrived on station in French Indochina, though a preliminary peace agreement had already been signed on 4 April, so the ships saw no action during the war. Magon remained in East Asia only briefly before moving to the Pacific Station along with the unprotected cruiser .

By 1890, Magon had returned to France, though she was not assigned to an active formation. The following year, she was sent to patrol the West Indies. In December, she was at Martinique, where she met the Dutch cruiser . In January 1892, Magon was joined there by the cruiser  and the aviso . In August and September, Magon, De Ruyter, the German corvette , the Spanish sloop , and the British screw corvettes  and  cruised off the coast of Venezuela to observe the political situation there. During the unrest in Venezuela, locals had attacked European nationals, and the international squadron that had assembled to ensure the situation did not escalate. She remained in the unit through most of the year, before being relieved by Roland in September. Magon was eventually struck from the naval register on 19 December 1895. She was sold on 17 July 1896 to ship breakers in Brest, France, to be scrapped.

Notes

References
 
 
 
 
 
 
 
 
 
 
 
 

Villars-class cruisers
Ships built in France
1880 ships